Carlo Cokxxx Nutten 2 is a 2009 collaboration album between German rappers Bushido and Fler. The album was titled as second part, but is actually the third part of the Carlo Cokxxx Nutten albums.

During the production Bushido confirmed that the album release as Carlo Cokxxx Nutten 3, but it later changed to Carlo Cokxxx Nutten 2 – Reloaded and finally Carlo Cokxxx Nutten 2.

The double A-side single "Eine Chance/Zu Gangsta" reached number 26 in the Media Control Charts from Germany and Austria.

Information 
On this album, Bushido and Fler used again the pseudonyms "Sonny Black" and "Frank White", like they did it on the 2002 album Carlo Cokxxx Nutten.
The beats for the album were actually planned for the soundtrack of the movie Zeiten ändern dich.

On 1 April 2009, Berlin label Aggro Berlin closed down as Fler had left the label a week earlier. After the label bosses showed officially on their homepage that the label had closed down, Bushido contacted Fler and both artists became again friends.

Musical style 
Similar to Carlo Cokxxx Nutten, the album contains battle rap songs with typical gangsta rap themes, such as crime and violence. The album also contains deeper songs, such as "Zukunft (Part 2)", which reflects on the rappers' friendship and the six years of feud between them.

Track listing

Samples 
"Ich war noch nie wie die"
"Vaterland" by Bushido feat. Fler
"Du bist out" by Bushido (alias Sonny Black) & Baba Saad
"Zukunft (Part 2)"
"Zukunft" by Bushido feat. Fler
"Highlife"
"Dreckstück" by Bushido feat. Fler
"Zu Gangsta"
"I'm a Hustla" by Cassidy
"Boss" by Bushido & Fler (alias Sonny Black & Frank White)
"Fight Music" by D12

Personnel 

Mastered by – Dirk Niemeyer
Mixed by – Beatzarre
Recorded by – Djorkaeff (tracks 2–17)
Scratches – DJ Stickle (tracks 4, 9, 10, 15, 16, 17)

Charts

References 

2009 albums
Bushido (rapper) albums
Fler albums
Collaborative albums
German-language albums